The Meghna is a major river in Bangladesh.

Meghna may also refer to:

BNS Meghna, patrol craft of the Bangladeshi Navy
Meghna Bank, Bangladeshi bank
Meghna Group, Bangladeshi business group

People with the given name Meghna:
Meghna Chakrabarti, American radio personality
Meghna Gulzar (born 1973), Indian filmmaker
Meghna Kothari, Indian actress
Meghna Malik (born 1971), Indian actress
Meghna Naidu (born 1982), Indian actress and dancer
Meghna Nair (born 1989), Indian actress in Tamil and Malayalam films
Meghna Pant, Indian novelist and journalist
Meghna Venkat, Indian Bharatanatyam dancer
Meghna Vincent (born 1990), South Indian television actress and dancer

See also
Megna (disambiguation)
Meghana (name)

Indian feminine given names